Meygoli (also Romanized as Meygolī and Maigali; also known as Maīqālī) is a village in Dadenjan Rural District, Meymand District, Firuzabad County, Fars Province, Iran. At the 2006 census, its population was 247, in 54 families.

References 

Populated places in Firuzabad County